El Hadaik is a district in Skikda Province, Algeria on the Mediterranean Sea. It was named after its capital, El Hadaik.

Municipalities
The district is further divided into 3 municipalities:
El Hadaik
Aïn Zïout
Bouchtata

Districts of Skikda Province